Anatoly Lagetko (6 November 1936 – 13 August 2006) was a boxer from the Soviet Union. He was born in Tokmak, Ukrainian SSR. He competed for the Soviet Union in the 1956 Summer Olympics held in Melbourne, Australia in the lightweight event, where he finished in third place.

References
Anatoly Lagetko's profile at Sports Reference.com

1936 births
2006 deaths
Soviet male boxers
Olympic boxers of the Soviet Union
Olympic bronze medalists for the Soviet Union
Boxers at the 1956 Summer Olympics
Olympic medalists in boxing
Ukrainian male boxers
Medalists at the 1956 Summer Olympics
Lightweight boxers